Padewski (feminine: Padewska) is a Polish-language toponymic surname which literally means "from Padua", "of Padua" (Polish: z Padwy). For example, saint Anthony of Padua is called "Antoni Padewski" in Polish. Notable people with the surname include:

 Józef Padewski (1894–1951), bishop of Polish National Catholic Church
 Stanislaw Padewski (1932–2017), Roman Catholic bishop

Polish-language surnames
Polish toponymic surnames